Arròs negre is a Valencian and Catalan dish made with cuttlefish (or squid) and rice, somewhat similar to seafood paella. Some call it paella negra ("black paella"), although it is traditionally not called a paella even though it is prepared in a similar manner.

Arròs negre should not be confused with black rice, the collective name for several cultivars of heirloom rice that have a naturally dark color.

The traditional recipe for this dish calls for squid ink, cuttlefish or squid, white rice, garlic, green cubanelle peppers, sweet paprika, olive oil and seafood broth. However, many cooks add other seafood as well, such as crab and shrimp.

The dish's dark color comes from squid ink which also enhances its seafood flavor.

In addition to Valencia and Catalonia, this dish is popular in Cuba and Puerto Rico where on both islands it is known as arroz con calamares ("rice with squid" in Spanish). In the Philippines, it is considered to be a subtype of the Filipino adaptation of paelya and is known as paella negra (or paelya negra). Black rice dishes with cuttlefish or squid ink are also made in Italy, Croatia and Montenegro, where they are known as "black risotto".

Fideuà negra ("black noodles" in Valencian) is a variation made with noodles instead of rice and is usually served with aioli.

See also

References

Spanish rice dishes
Latin American rice dishes
Squid dishes
Catalan cuisine
Valencian cuisine
Puerto Rican cuisine
Seafood and rice dishes